Peripatus manni is a species of velvet worm in the Peripatidae family. The male of this species has 29 pairs of legs; females have 30 or 31. The type locality is in Haiti.

References

Onychophorans of tropical America
Onychophoran species
Animals described in 1913